Anthia babaulti is a species of ground beetle in the subfamily Anthiinae. It was described by Benard in 1921.

References

Anthiinae (beetle)
Beetles described in 1921